Jehan Erart (or Erars) (c.1200/10–1258/9) was a trouvère from Arras, particularly noted for his favouring the pastourelle genre. He has left behind eleven pastourelles, ten grand chants, and one serventois.

Erart's presence at Arras can be deduced from his own writings. He was patronised by the wealthy middle and upper classes. In his serventois, a complainte on the death his patron Gherart Aniel, he asked Pierre and Wagon Wion to help him obtain the patronage of the bankers Henri and Robert Crespin. His relationship with two Arras trouvères is apparent in his lyrics, Guillaume le Vinier and Jehan Bretel. He is also mentioned in a work of Guibert Kaukesel, a canon of Arras.

The chief characteristic of Erart's poetry is his preference for short lines, mostly penta-, hexa-, hepta-, and octosyllabic, as opposed to the traditional decasyllable, which does occur in his chansons "Pré ne vergier ne boscaige foillu" and "Encoire sui cil ki a merchi s'atent" and his serventois "Nus chanters". Musically, Erart is syllabic, with a preference for major modes and refrains. His chansons are composed mainly in isometre, but his pastourelles are predominantly heterometric. His music is conservative and rarely exceeds a ninth in range.

There are two death notices for Erart in the necrology of the Confrérie des jongleurs et bourgeois d'Arras. One records a Jehans Erardi dying in 1258 while another records Jehan Erart dying in 1259. It is possible, when considering that his works are preserved in two different sections of the Chansonnier du Roi, that there were two Jehan Erarts, but this is not likely. Three songs attributed to Jehan Erart in one manuscript probably belong to Raoul de Beauvais.

Notes

Trouvères
1259 deaths
Year of birth uncertain
Male classical composers